The 1908 All-Ireland Senior Football Championship was the 22nd staging of Ireland's premier Gaelic football knock-out competition. Dublin won their eleventh All-Ireland title.

Format
The four provincial championships were played as usual; the four champions joined  in the All-Ireland championship.

Results

Connacht Senior Football Championship

Leinster Senior Football Championship

Munster Senior Football Championship

Ulster Senior Football Championship

An objection was made and a replay ordered.

All-Ireland Senior Football Championship

Championship statistics

Miscellaneous

 Dublin win a 10th All Ireland in 17 years a 2nd 3 in a row in history.

References